Antero Sotamaa (born 28 April 1940) is a Finnish former sailor who competed in the 1972 Summer Olympics.

References

1940 births
Living people
Finnish male sailors (sport)
Olympic sailors of Finland
Sailors at the 1972 Summer Olympics – Dragon
Place of birth missing (living people)